The Winter Haven Red Sox were a minor league baseball team in the Florida State League (FSL), based in Winter Haven, Florida, from 1969–1992.

Team history
The franchise began in 1966 in Deerfield Beach, Florida, as the Deerfield Beach Sun Sox, a Class-A affiliate of the Chicago White Sox. However, on June 27, 1966, the team moved to Winter Haven becoming the Winter Haven Sun Sox. It was the city's first entry in Organized Baseball since the 1919 Bartow Polkers played part of their home schedule in Winter Haven. The Sun Sox were managed by Don Bacon and Bruce Andrew and had a 55–83 record overall.

In 1967, the Sun Sox were renamed the Winter Haven Mets after their new parent club, the New York Mets. The Mets posted a stellar 94–46 record, but were defeated by the St. Petersburg Cardinals for the western division title by two and a half games. Nolan Ryan, then 20, pitched for the 1967 team, appearing in one game as a starting pitcher and allowing one hit and one earned run in four innings pitched, with five strikeouts. It was Ryan's last year in the minors before he began his Baseball Hall of Fame big-league career.

The Mets left Winter Haven after only a single season, then the franchise lay dormant during 1968.  In 1969, the Boston Red Sox, who had established their spring training home in Winter Haven in 1966, took over the Florida State League franchise.  The Winter Haven Red Sox then played for the next 24 consecutive seasons. In 1983, 16 years after Ryan's one-game stint, Roger Clemens began his pro career with Winter Haven, winning three of four decisions in four starts, and striking out 36 in 29 innings pitched.

The Winter Haven Red Sox effectively folded after the 1992 season, when, after 27 years, the parent Red Sox moved their spring headquarters to Fort Myers and their FSL affiliate to Fort Lauderdale. Although the Cleveland Indians replaced the Red Sox as Winter Haven's spring training tenants from 1993 through 2008, they never revived an FSL franchise for the city.

The ballpark
The team played home games at Chain of Lakes Park, located at 500 Cletus Allen Drive. The park still exists as part of the Chain of Lakes Sports Complex.

Notable alumni

Baseball Hall of Fame alumni
 Jeff Bagwell (1989) Inducted, 2017
 Jim Rice (1972) Inducted, 2009
 Nolan Ryan (1967) Inducted, 1999

Notable alumni

 Brady Anderson (1986) 3 x MLB All-Star
 Oil Can Boyd (1981)
 Ellis Burks (1984) 2 x MLB All-Star
 Rick Burleson (1970) 4 x MLB All-Star
 Roger Clemens (1983) 1986 AL Most Valuable Player, 7 x Cy Young Award
 Scott Hatteberg (1991)
 Bruce Hurst (1977) MLB All-Star
 Bob Ojeda (1979)
 Ben Oglivie (1969) 1980 AL Home Run Leader
 Paul Quantrill (1990) MLB All-Star
 Ken Singleton (1967) 3 x MLB All-Star
 Bob Stanley (1975, 1988) 2 x MLB All-Star

Year-by-year record

References

Baseball teams established in 1966
Winter Haven, Florida
Deerfield Beach, Florida
Sports in Polk County, Florida
Defunct Florida State League teams
New York Mets minor league affiliates
Boston Red Sox minor league affiliates
Chicago White Sox minor league affiliates
1966 establishments in Florida
1992 disestablishments in Florida
Defunct baseball teams in Florida
Baseball teams disestablished in 1992